Bindiganavile Srinivas Iyengar Ranga (11 November 1917 – 12 December 2010) was an Indian photographer, actor, producer and director who has made many landmark movies in Kannada, Telugu, and Tamil. He was also the owner of Vikram Studios. He has directed and produced about 87 films in these three languages with a maximum of 18 films in Kannada alone starring matinee idol Rajkumar.

Biography
He was born in Magadi Village (near Bare, India) Mysore (now part of Karnataka State). After an art-enriched childhood wherein he interacted with many stage personalities, B.S. Ranga entered the field of photography. At the age of 17, the self-trained Ranga sent some of his work to be exhibited at the Royal Salon in London, and was elected an Honorary Fellow of the Royal Photographic Society.

Subsequently, he moved to Bombay (now Mumbai) and apprenticed himself to the cameraman and laboratory technician, Krishna Gopal. B.S. Ranga then embarked on a film career lasting more than five decades, during which he played the roles of cinematographer, director, producer, laboratory owner, studio owner, exhibitor and script-writer, sometimes all at once for one of his productions. His production company, Vikram Productions, gained prominence in the 1960s and 1970s, and won B.S. Ranga many awards, including two President's Awards. The first was for Tenali Ramakrishna in Telugu (starring N.T. Rama Rao and Akkineni Nageswara Rao), and the second was for Amarshilpi Jakkanachari, the first colour movie produced in Kannada.

Filmography

As director

As Cinematographer

As producer

As Screenwriter

Awards
National Film Awards:
All India Certificate of Merit for Best Feature Film in 1957.
1956 –  President's silver medal for Best Feature Film in Telugu – Tenali Ramakrishna

References

External

1917 births
2010 deaths
Kannada film directors
Telugu film directors
20th-century Indian film directors
Tamil film directors
Hindi-language film directors
Telugu film cinematographers
Kannada film cinematographers
Kannada film producers
Telugu film producers
Tamil film producers
Kannada screenwriters
People from Ramanagara district
Film directors from Karnataka
Film producers from Karnataka
Screenwriters from Karnataka
20th-century Indian dramatists and playwrights
Cinematographers from Karnataka